Flammeovirga is a Gram-negative, aerobic, non-spore-forming and chemoorganotrophic genus from the family of Flammeovirgaceae which occur in marine environments.

References

Further reading 
 
 
 
 
 
 <

Cytophagia
Bacteria genera